Benjamín Sánchez Bermejo (born 10 March 1985 in Cieza, Murcia) is a Spanish race walker.

International competitions

References

External links

1985 births
Living people
People from Cieza, Murcia
Sportspeople from the Region of Murcia
Spanish male racewalkers
Olympic athletes of Spain
Athletes (track and field) at the 2008 Summer Olympics
Athletes (track and field) at the 2012 Summer Olympics
World Athletics Championships athletes for Spain